Turning Point is the second album by American organist Lonnie Smith recorded in 1969 and released on the Blue Note label.

Reception
The Allmusic review by Stephen Thomas Erlewine awarded the album 3 stars and stated "While the more adventurous elements of Turning Point make for an intriguing listen, the album isn't quite as enjoyable as the harder grooving sessions or the spacier soul-jazz records from the same era. Nevertheless, it's a worthwhile listen".

Track listing
All compositions by Lonnie Smith except as indicated
 "See Saw" (Don Covay, Steve Cropper) - 5:54
 "Slow High" - 6:31
 "People Sure Act Funny" (Bobby Robinson, Titus Turner) - 6:25
 "Eleanor Rigby" (John Lennon, Paul McCartney) - 9:18
 "Turning Point" - 8:23
Recorded at Rudy Van Gelder Studio, Englewood Cliffs, New Jersey on January 3, 1969

Personnel
Lonnie Smith - organ
Lee Morgan - trumpet (tracks 1, 2, 4 & 5)
Bennie Maupin - tenor saxophone (tracks 1, 2, 4 & 5)
Julian Priester - trombone (tracks 1, 2, 4 & 5)
Melvin Sparks - guitar
Idris Muhammad - drums

References

Blue Note Records albums
Lonnie Smith (organist) albums
1969 albums
Albums recorded at Van Gelder Studio
Albums produced by Francis Wolff